Aşağı Yağləvənd (also, Aşağı Yağlıvənd, Ashagy Yaglevend and Yaglavend) is a village and municipality in the Fuzuli District of Azerbaijan.  It has a population of 2,191.

References 

Populated places in Fuzuli District